Helena Wulff (born February 7, 1954) is professor of social anthropology at Stockholm University. Her research is in the anthropology of communication and aesthetics based on a wide range of studies of the social worlds of literary production, dance, and the visual arts.

Academic work
While Wulff early research was on youth culture and ethnicity, her specialist skills include expressive cultural form (dance, art, images, text) in a transnational perspective, visual culture, the emotions, and media, as well as anthropological methods. She has conducted field studies in Stockholm, London, New York City, Frankfurt-am-Main, and Ireland (mostly Dublin). Wulff's current research is on migrant writing in Sweden. Drawing on her research, she teaches courses on Media anthropology, Visual Culture, Communication and Aesthetics, Anthropological Writing Genres, and Anthropological Methods.

Wulff has held visiting professorships at University of Illinois at Urbana-Champaign, National University of Singapore, University of Vienna, and University of Ulster, as well as a Leverhulme visiting professorship at University of East London. She was Editor-in-Chief (with Dorle Dracklé) of Social Anthropology/Anthropologie Sociale, the journal of the European Association of Social Anthropologists (EASA), and Vice President of EASA. She was Chair of the Swedish Anthropological Association (SANT). Wulff is a member of the steering committee of the multidisciplinary research programme Cosmopolitan and Vernacular Dynamics in World Literatures, funded by the Swedish Foundation for Humanities and Social Sciences 2016-2021.

Wulff is an editor (with Deborah Reed-Danahay) of the book series “Palgrave Studies in Literary Anthropology” (Palgrave, New York), and editor (with Jonathan Skinner) of the book series “Dance and Performance Studies” Berghahn Books, Oxford, and a member of the advisory boards of the journals Anthropologica, Anthropological Journal of European Cultures, AnthroVision, Cultural Sociology, Culture Unbound, and Social Anthropology/Anthropologie Sociale.

Selected works

Books 
2017: Rhythms of Writing: An Anthropology of Irish Literature. London: Bloomsbury.
2016: The Anthropologist as Writer: Genres and Contexts in the Twenty-First Century. Oxford: Berghahn Books. Editor.
2010: Ethnographic Practice in the Present. Oxford: Berghahn Books. Editor with  Marit Melhuus and Jon Mitchell.
2007: Dancing at the Crossroads: Memory and Mobility in Ireland. Oxford: Berghahn Books.
2007: The Emotions: A Cultural Reader. London: Berg/Bloomsbury. Editor.
2003: New Technologies at Work: People, Screens and Social Virtuality. London: Berg/Bloomsbury. Editor with Christina Garsten.
1998, reprinted 2001: Ballet across Borders: Career and Culture in the World of Dancers. London: Berg/Bloomsbury.  
1995: Youth Cultures: A Cross-Cultural Perspective. London: Routledge. Editor with Vered Amit-Talai.   
1988: Twenty Girls: Growing Up, Ethnicity and Excitement in a South London Microculture.  Stockholm Studies in Social Anthropology, 21. Stockholm: Almqvist & Wiksell International.

Journal articles, book chapters and encyclopedia entries 
2018: “Diversifying from Within: Diaspora Writings in Sweden,” in Morten Nielsen and Nigel Rapport (eds.),  The Composition of Anthropology: How Anthropological Texts are Written. London: Routledge, pp. 122–136.
2018: “Foreword,” in Lauren Miller Griffith and Jonathan S. Marion (eds.), Apprenticeship Pilgrimage: Developing Expertise through Travel and Training. Lanham: Lexington Books, pp. vii-xi. 
2017: “Stories of the Soil: In the Irish Literary World,” in Diarmuid Ó Giolláin and Martine Segalen (eds.), Irish Ethnologies. Notre Dame: University of Notre Dame Press, pp. 141–157. 
2017: “Greater than Its Size: Ireland in Literature and Life,” in Ulf Hannerz and Andre Gingrich (eds.), Small Countries: Structures and Sensibilities. Philadelphia: University of Pennsylvania Press, pp. 301–316.     
2017: ”Manhattan as a Magnet: Place and Circulation among Young Swedes,” in Virginia R. Dominguez and Jasmin Habib (eds.), America Observed: On an International Anthropology of the United States. Oxford: Berghahn, pp. 31–50. 
2017: “Global spridning av lokala teman,” Review article of Crime Fiction as World Literature edited by Louise Nilsson, David Damrosh and Theo D´haen (Bloomsbury 2017). Respons, nr 6, pp 66–68.
2016: “Introducing the Anthropologist as Writer Across and Within Genres,” in Helena Wulff (ed.), The Anthropologist as Writer: Genres and Contexts in the Twenty-First Century. Oxford: Berghahn, pp. 1–18.
2015: “Jazz i Ghana: Musik som kosmopolitism,” in Kulturella Perspektiv, 2(24): 34-38.
2015: “In Favour of Flexible Forms: Multi-Sited Fieldwork,” in Forum: Re-thinking Euro-Anthropology. Social Anthropology, 23(3): 355-357.
2015: “The Pains and Peaks of Being a Ballerina in London,” in Ilana Gershon (ed.), A World of Work: Imagined Manuals for Real Jobs. Ithaca: Cornell University Press, pp. 207–220.
2015: “Ireland in the World, the World in Ireland”, American Anthropologist, 117(1): 142-143.
2015: “Dance, Anthropology of,” in James D. Wright (editor-in-chief), International Encyclopedia of the Social and Behavioral Sciences, 2nd edition, Vol. 5. Oxford: Elsevier, pp. 666–670.
2014: “Anthropologist in the Irish Literary World: Reflexivity through Studying Sideways”, in Thomas Hylland Eriksen, Christina Garsten and Shalini Randeria (eds.). Anthropology Now and Next: Essays in Honor of Ulf Hannerz. New York: Berghahn, pp. 147–161.
2013: “Ethnografiction and Reality in Contemporary Irish Literature”, in Marilyn Cohen (ed.), Novel Approaches to Anthropology: Contributions to Literary Anthropology. New York City: Lexington Books, pp. 205–225.  
2013: “Dance ethnography”, in Oxford Bibliographies Online. New York: Oxford University Press.
2013: “Ways of Seeing Ireland´s Green: From Ban to the Branding of a Nation”, The Senses and Society, vol. 9, no.2, 233-240.
2012: “An Anthropological Perspective on Literary Arts in Ireland” in Ullrich Kockel, Máiréad Nic Craith and Jonas Frykman (eds), Blackwell Companion to the Anthropology of Europe. Oxford: Wiley-Blackwell, pp. 537–550. 
2012: “Instances of Inspiration: Interviewing Dancers and Writers”, in Jonathan Skinner (ed.), The Interview: An Ethnographic Approach.  London: Bloomsbury, pp. 163–177.
2012: “Ballet Culture and the Market: A Transnational Perspective”, in Hélène Neveu Kringelbach and Jonathan Skinner (eds.), Dancing Cultures: Globalisation, Tourism and Identity. Oxford: Berghahn, pp. 46–59.  
2012: “Color and Cultural Identity in Ireland”, in Marilyn DeLong and Barbara Martinson (eds.), Color and Design. London: Bloomsbury, pp. 101–109.
2012: “Commentary: Fixity and Forms of Dance Circulation”, (Online) Journal for the Anthropological Study of Human Movement (JASHM), special issue on Performance in Circulation, vol. 17, no. 2.
2011: “Histoires de Terroir: Les Écrivains contemporains et l´Irlande Nouvelle”, Ethnologie française, Avril, 2: 301-308.  
2010: ”Costume for Dance”, in Berg Encyclopedia of World Dress and Fashion, West Europe,: Volume 8: 498-502. Oxford: Berg/Bloomsbury.: 
2010: “Colm Tóibín as Travel Writer”, Nordic Irish Studies, 9: 109-116. 
2009: “Ethnografiction: Irish Relations in the Writing of Éilís Ní Dhuibhne”, in Rebecca Pelan (ed.), Éilís Ní Dhuibhne: Perspectives. Galway: Arlen House, pp. 245–261. 
2008: “To Know the Dancer: Formations of Fieldwork in the Ballet World”, in Narmala Halstead, Eric Hirsch and Judith Okely (eds.), Knowing How to Know: Fieldwork and the Ethnographic Present. Oxford: Berghahn Books, pp. 76–91.
2008: “Literary Readings as Performance: On the Career of Contemporary Writers in the New Ireland”, Anthropological Journal of European Cultures, 17: 98-113. 
2008: ”Ethereal Expression: Paradoxes of Ballet as a Global Physical Culture”, Ethnography, 9(4): 519-536. 
2007: “Longing for the Land: Emotions, Memory and Nature in Irish Travel Advertisements”, Identities 14(4): 527-544.
2006: “Experiencing the Ballet Body: Pleasure, Pain, Power”, in Suzel Ana Reily (ed.), The Musical Human: Rethinking John Blacking's Ethnomusicology in the 21st Century. Aldershot: Ashgate Press, pp. 125–142.    
2005: “´High Arts´and the Market: An Uneasy Partnership in the Transnational World of Ballet”, in David Inglis and John Hughson (eds.), The Sociology of Art: Ways of Seeing. Basingstoke: Palgrave, pp. 171–182.
2005: “Memories in Motion: The Irish Dancing Body”, Body & Society, issue on “the dancing body”, (ed.) Bryan S. Turner, vol. 11(4): 45-62.

External links 
 Helena Wulff, Department of Social Anthropology, Stockholm University
 Helena Wulff on Writing Anthropology, Cultural Anthropology, AnthroPod podcast
 Interview with Helena Wulff about her book Rhythms of Writing. An Anthropology of Irish Literature published on the CaMP Anthropology blog (2018-04-09).
 Interview with Helena Wulff about her book Rhythms of Writing. An Anthropology of Irish Literature published on Alma Gottlieb’s blog (2018-05-27)

Social anthropologists
Living people
Academic staff of Stockholm University
1954 births
University of Illinois Urbana-Champaign faculty
Academic staff of the National University of Singapore
Academic staff of the University of Vienna
Academics of Ulster University
Academics of the University of East London
Swedish women academics
Swedish women anthropologists